Agrotera rufitinctalis is a moth in the family Crambidae. It was described by George Hampson in 1917. It is found in Malawi and Zimbabwe.

References

Moths described in 1917
Spilomelinae
Moths of Africa